Yan Zi and Zheng Jie were the defending champions, but DAB together this year.

Seeds

  Lisa Raymond   Samantha Stosur  (first round)
  Cara Black   Liezel Huber (semifinals)
  Daniela Hantuchová   Ai Sugiyama (quarterfinals)
  Anna-Lena Grönefeld   Meghann Shaughnessy (champions)

Draw

Draw

External links
Main Draw and Qualifying Draw

wom
Medibank International - Women's Doubles